Little Stanmore was an ancient parish of Middlesex which is today the residential area of Canons Park in the London Borough of Harrow, England.

Toponymy

The name 'Stanmore' means "pond made of stone".

Little Stanmore was named to distinguish it from Great Stanmore, which is now known as Stanmore. The parish was also known as Whitchurch. Whitchurch is a common English place-name meaning 'white church', and probably referring to a church built of stone. The name has fallen out of use and is preserved in Whitchurch Gardens and Whitchurch Lane.

History
Little Stanmore formed an ancient parish in the Gore hundred of Middlesex. It was grouped for relief of the poor and sanitary provision into Hendon Poor Law Union in 1836 and Hendon rural sanitary district in 1875. The parish became part of Hendon Rural District from 1894, and was abolished as a civil parish in 1934, becoming absorbed by Harrow Urban District. The population in 1901 was 1,069 and in 1931 it was 6,918.

St Lawrence's Church

The medieval St Lawrence's Church was reconstructed by James Brydges, 1st Duke of Chandos in the baroque style.  The architect was John James, who also worked on the Duke of Chandos' nearby house called Cannons (which was demolished in 1747).  It is possible that James Gibbs oversaw the finishing touches to the church when he replaced John James as the Duke's architect in 1715. The interior retains early eighteenth-century paintings by artists such as Louis Laguerre and there is an organ played by Handel and restored in the 1990s to its original condition. In the churchyard is a tombstone to William Powell, supposedly "The Harmonious Blacksmith" who inspired one of Handel's keyboard works.

References

External links
http://www.achurchnearyou.com/st-lawrence-whitchurch/
http://www.little-stanmore.org/

Areas of London
Districts of the London Borough of Harrow
Places formerly in Middlesex